Collison House is a historic home located at Newport, New Castle County, Delaware.  It was built about 1885, and is a -story, three bay by three bay, square frame dwelling with a mansard roof in the Second Empire style. The mansard roof has broad gable dormers and the house features a two-story, projecting bay. It has a full width, hipped roof porch on the front facade.

It was added to the National Register of Historic Places in 1993.

References

Houses on the National Register of Historic Places in Delaware
Second Empire architecture in Delaware
Houses completed in 1885
Houses in New Castle County, Delaware
National Register of Historic Places in New Castle County, Delaware